Lists of Twenty20 International cricketers are lists of Twenty20 International cricket players by team.

 List of Afghanistan Twenty20 International cricketers
 List of Argentina Twenty20 International cricketers
 List of Australia Twenty20 International cricketers
 List of Austria Twenty20 International cricketers
 List of Bahamas Twenty20 International cricketers
 List of Bahrain Twenty20 International cricketers
 List of Bangladesh Twenty20 International cricketers
 List of Belgium Twenty20 International cricketers
 List of Belize Twenty20 International cricketers
 List of Bermuda Twenty20 International cricketers
 List of Bhutan Twenty20 International cricketers
 List of Botswana Twenty20 International cricketers
 List of Brazil Twenty20 International cricketers
 List of Bulgaria Twenty20 International cricketers
 List of Cameroon Twenty20 International cricketers
 List of Canada Twenty20 International cricketers
 List of Cayman Islands Twenty20 International cricketers
 List of Chile Twenty20 International cricketers
 List of Cook Islands Twenty20 International cricketers
 List of Costa Rica Twenty20 International cricketers
 List of Croatia Twenty20 International cricketers
 List of Cyprus Twenty20 International cricketers
 List of Czech Republic Twenty20 International cricketers
 List of Denmark Twenty20 International cricketers
 List of England Twenty20 International cricketers
 List of Estonia Twenty20 International cricketers
 List of Eswatini Twenty20 International cricketers
 List of Fiji Twenty20 International cricketers
 List of Finland Twenty20 International cricketers
 List of France Twenty20 International cricketers
 List of Germany Twenty20 International cricketers
 List of Ghana Twenty20 International cricketers
 List of Gibraltar Twenty20 International cricketers
 List of Greece Twenty20 International cricketers
 List of Guernsey Twenty20 International cricketers
 List of Hong Kong Twenty20 International cricketers
 List of Hungary Twenty20 International cricketers
 List of India Twenty20 International cricketers
 List of Indonesia Twenty20 International cricketers
 List of Iran Twenty20 International cricketers
 List of Ireland Twenty20 International cricketers
 List of Isle of Man Twenty20 International cricketers
 List of Israel Twenty20 International cricketers
 List of Italy Twenty20 International cricketers
 List of Japan Twenty20 International cricketers
 List of Jersey Twenty20 International cricketers
 List of Kenya Twenty20 International cricketers
 List of Kuwait Twenty20 International cricketers
 List of Lesotho Twenty20 International cricketers
 List of Luxembourg Twenty20 International cricketers
 List of Malawi Twenty20 International cricketers
 List of Malaysia Twenty20 International cricketers
 List of Maldives Twenty20 International cricketers
 List of Malta Twenty20 International cricketers
 List of Mexico Twenty20 International cricketers
 List of Mozambique Twenty20 International cricketers
 List of Namibia Twenty20 International cricketers
 List of Nepal Twenty20 International cricketers
 List of Netherlands Twenty20 International cricketers
 List of New Zealand Twenty20 International cricketers
 List of Nigeria Twenty20 International cricketers
 List of Norway Twenty20 International cricketers
 List of Oman Twenty20 International cricketers
 List of Pakistan Twenty20 International cricketers
 List of Panama Twenty20 International cricketers
 List of Papua New Guinea Twenty20 International cricketers
 List of Peru Twenty20 International cricketers
 List of Philippines Twenty20 International cricketers
 List of Portugal Twenty20 International cricketers
 List of Qatar Twenty20 International cricketers
 List of Romania Twenty20 International cricketers
 List of Rwanda Twenty20 International cricketers
 List of Samoa Twenty20 International cricketers
 List of Saudi Arabia Twenty20 International cricketers
 List of Scotland Twenty20 International cricketers
 List of Serbia Twenty20 International cricketers
 List of Seychelles Twenty20 International cricketers
 List of Sierra Leone Twenty20 International cricketers
 List of Singapore Twenty20 International cricketers
 List of Slovenia Twenty20 International cricketers
 List of South Africa Twenty20 International cricketers
 List of South Korea Twenty20 International cricketers
 List of Spain Twenty20 International cricketers
 List of Sri Lanka Twenty20 International cricketers
 List of Sweden Twenty20 International cricketers
 List of Switzerland Twenty20 International cricketers
 List of Tanzania Twenty20 International cricketers
 List of Thailand Twenty20 International cricketers
 List of Turkey Twenty20 International cricketers
 List of Uganda Twenty20 International cricketers
 List of United Arab Emirates Twenty20 International cricketers
 List of United States Twenty20 International cricketers
 List of Vanuatu Twenty20 International cricketers
 List of West Indies Twenty20 International cricketers
 List of World XI Twenty20 International cricketers
 List of Zimbabwe Twenty20 International cricketers

See also
 Lists of Test cricketers
 Lists of One Day International cricketers

Twenty20